Jean-Claude Bertrand (born 5 August 1954) is a retired badminton player from France.

He won 12 French National Championships, 8 in mixed doubles, 2 in men's doubles and 2 in men's singles.

References
European results

1954 births
French male badminton players
Living people
20th-century French people